Sandy Gully is a small town in the Mid West region of Western Australia.

References

Shire of Northampton
Towns in Western Australia